Sarah Banet-Weiser is an academic and author. She is currently a joint professor at the Annenberg School of Communication at University of Southern California and at the University of Pennsylvania. She previously was the Head of the London School of Economics and Political Science's Media and Communication Department. In July 2014, Banet-Weiser became director of the USC Annenberg School for Communication. She left the position and became the new Head of the Media and Communication Department at the London School of Economics and Political Science in the fall of 2018.

Professional work
In 2012, Banet-Weiser's book, Authentic™: The Politics of Ambivalence in a Brand Culture, was released. The book looks at consumerism and brands. The book was reviewed in Slate. Her work has been featured in the Wall Street Journal, Media, Culture & Society, Journal of Consumer Culture. In 2018 Banet-Weiser's book, Empowered: Popular Feminism and Popular Misogyny was released in the United Kingdom. 
 and the United States.

Works
Banet-Weiser, Sarah. Authentic™: The Politics of Ambivalence in a Brand Culture,. New York: NYU Press (2012). 
Banet-Weiser, Sarah, Cynthia Chris and Anthony Freitas. Cable Visions. New York: NYU Press Academic (2007). 
Banet-Weiser, Sarah. Kids Rule!: Nickelodeon and Consumer Citizenship (Console-ing Passions). Durham: Duke University (2007). 
Banet-Weiser, Sarah. The Most Beautiful Girl in the World: Beauty Pageants and National Identity. Berkeley: University of California Press (1999).
Banet-Weiser, Sarah. Empowered: Popular Feminism and Popular Misogyny. Duke University Press Books (2018).

References

External links
Official website
Interview with Banet-Weiser via Books Aren't Dead
"Thinking Critically About Brand Cultures: An Interview with Sarah Banet-Weiser" by Henry Jenkins.

American women academics
21st-century American women writers
University of Southern California faculty
American women non-fiction writers
21st-century American non-fiction writers
Beauty pageants researchers
Living people
Year of birth missing (living people)